Political jurisprudence is a legal theory that some judicial decisions are motivated more by politics than by unbiased judgment. According to Professor Martin Shapiro of University of California, Berkeley, who first noted the theory in 1964: "The core of  political jurisprudence is a vision of courts as political agencies and judges as political actors." Legal decisions are no longer focused on a judge's analytical analysis (as in Analytical jurisprudence), but rather it is the judges themselves that become the focus for determining how the decision was reached. Political jurisprudence advocates that judges are not machines but are influenced and swayed by the political system and by their own personal beliefs of how the law should be decided. That is not to say necessarily that judges arbitrarily make decisions they personally feel should be right without regard to stare decisis. Instead they are making decisions based on their political, legal, and personal beliefs as it relates to the law. Deeply, and with more implication for the society, the decisions of the judges are not only modified from the politics, but modify itself the politics and the process of law making in a so influential way, that we can say that the policy-making is "judicialized".

Shapiro noted political jurisprudence as having two wings, the macro wing and the micro wing. The macro wing looks at courts as players in the political process. In their processes of decision making, they entertain matters from different interest groups hence shape policy through pressure from these. the micro wing looks at individual decisions of judges. The second wing is a manifestation of Charles H. Pritchett who introduced behaviorism into USA judicial studies after studies that showed individual decisions in courts have been increasing since the days of President Roosevelt.

Political jurisprudence can also be seen as a discipline of law. Unlike natural law which answers the fundamental law question by placing law as inherent in the hierarchy of nature, political jurisprudence present the answer as being deliberate human political process. Political jurisprudence presents law as a revolving concept which changes due to change in political perspectives.

Political jurisprudence is necessitated by the nature of Constitutional Law. The nature of a country's Constitution as a political tool and at the same time a legal document leaves grey areas in law where judges interpret the law according to their personal views.

History of Political Jurisprudence 
Political jurisprudence as a term was noted by Shapiro, but some legal scholars trace existence of activist judges to the 14th Century A.D where Justice W. Bereford is presented as an activist judge who made decisions based on personal biases.

Universality of Political Jurisprudence 
The Pakistani coup d’état, and a judgment of the Turkish Constitutional Court have been presented as evidence of the universal existence of political jurisprudence. The constitutional court in Pakistan gave legitimacy to the coup d’état while the Turkish courts judged against a constitutional amendment which was procedurally correct.

See also
Jurisprudence
Alec Stone Sweet

Notes

References 
1. Shapiro, Martin. "Political Jurisprudence", Kentucky Law Journal, 52 (1964), 294. 
2. Shapiro, Martin and Stone Sweet, Alec. "On Law, Politics, & Judicialization". Oxford University Press, 2002.
3. Stone Sweet, Alec. "Governing with Judges". Oxford University Press, 2000.

Philosophy of law
Jurisprudence